Praxis Ethiopia is an international organisation whose goal is to apply professional expertise to the problems of extreme poverty in Ethiopia. The word "Praxis" comes from the Greek language, and meaning the application of knowledge to solve problems. The organization is composed of educators, scientists, entrepreneurs, and technical advisors.

Structure
The organization has a Foundation that works to inform the world about Ethiopia, raises funds to support poverty reduction in Ethiopia and sub-Sahara Africa, and serves as the world headquarters for the Praxis Ethiopia Award for Distinguished Contributions to Development. 

The Foundation's Board of Directors is chaired by His Excellency Dr. Aseffa Abreha (Ethiopia's representative to the Food and Agriculture Organization of the United Nations) and is composed of internationally recognized pioneers in poverty reduction and sustainable development.
Ethiopia's former Prime Minister, Meles Zenawi was the Honorary Chairperson of the Board of Directors.

Founding
In January 2002, the United Nations Conference Center in Addis Ababa hosted Ethio-Forum 2002, a conference examining the progress and needs of poverty reduction in Ethiopia.  Conference attendees presented overviews of their work in strengthening food security, improving healthcare, promoting education, and the role of simple technology transfer in helping people rise above the devastating effects of extreme poverty.

Throughout the conference, an overarching theme emerged: Ethiopia's greatest single need is to have access to professional guidance in identifying good solutions to the problems of extreme poverty. This "technical backstopping" is vital for Ethiopia's recovery from decades of drought, famine, disease, and war. Dr. David A. Blankinship, Dr. Getachew Tikubet, and Dr. Donald C. Johnson developed an overall model for an organization that would mobilize international expertise to assist Ethiopians in their struggle to overcome extreme poverty. "Praxis Ethiopia" became the guiding principle for this organization. 

On 25 January 2002, they met with Prime Minister Meles Zenawi and outlined the concept of creating an international resource in service to poverty reduction in Ethiopia. During that meeting, Dr. Blankinship asked the Prime Minister to serve as the Patron to Praxis Ethiopia.

References

External links

Charities based in New York (state)
Foreign charities operating in Ethiopia